In the 2006–07 season, Partizan Belgrade competed in the Basketball League of Serbia, Radivoj Korać Cup, Adriatic League and Euroleague.

Players

Roster

Adriatic League

Standings

Regular season

Kup Radivoja Koraća

Quarterfinals

Semifinals

Final

Euroleague

Regular season

Group B

References

External links
 Official website 

KK Partizan seasons
Partizan